Ville Mäkilä (born 4 June 1990) is a Finnish former professional football player.

References
Guardian Football

1990 births
Living people
Finnish footballers
Association football defenders
FC Inter Turku players
Veikkausliiga players